KIHS may refer to:

 KIHS, a radio station licensed to Adel, Iowa, United States
 Keewaytinook Internet High School, a virtual school operated by the Keewaytinook Okimakanak Council serving aboriginal communities in northern Ontario, Canada
 Kent Island High School, in Stevensville, Maryland, United States